The Three Tuns Brewery in Bishop's Castle, Shropshire, England was established in 1642 on its current site, making it the oldest licensed brewery site in Britain. While some of the current building dates to the seventeenth century, the main building is a Victorian tower brewery erected about 1888, making it one of only four brewers in the United Kingdom to use such a method to brew beer. 

The brewery is Grade Two listed, described as "a rare survival of a small, working rural brewery".

In January 2003, the brewery was sold to the John Roberts' Brewing Co. Ltd. Owners John Russell and Bill Bainbridge refitted the brewery with modern brewing equipment whilst 150 tonnes of steel was used to uphold the structure of the tower, required because of a 20 fold increase in loadings following the brewery development project.

During 2013 the brewery was expanded to make room to facilitate more fermenting vessels, having operated at its brewing capacity of 90 brewers barrels for several years. There are new plans to further develop the brewery to a capacity of 160 brewers barrels per week, which will involve excavating into the brewery foundations as The Three Tuns will never brew outside of its 17th century and Victorian buildings.

In 2017, Lonely Planet described The Three Tuns Brewery as one of the best beer locations to visit across the world.

, the brewery has six regular ales and four seasonal beers. Emphasis is placed upon pale ale, with Maris Otter Malts being used frequently to achieve the pale-straw, light-tan and golden colours brewed.

References

External links
 Official website

Industrial buildings completed in 1888
Breweries in England
History of Shropshire
1642 establishments in England
Industrial archaeological sites in Shropshire
Bishop's Castle
Grade II listed buildings in Shropshire